Earle Goodwin Cook (November 9, 1881 – April 20, 1966) was a provincial politician from Alberta, Canada. He served as a member of the Legislative Assembly of Alberta from 1921 to 1930 sitting with the United Farmers caucus in government.

Political career
Cook ran for a seat to the Alberta Legislature in the 1921 Alberta general election as a United Farmers candidate in the Pincher Creek electoral district. The race for the seat was hotly contested with four candidates running. Cook defeated Liberal candidate Harvey Bossenberry by 101 votes to pick up the seat for his party.

The 1926 Alberta general election saw Cook and Bossenberry face each other for the second time. In the first count of ballots, Bossenberry received the most votes but less than a majority of votes cast. The three way race went to a second count - the second-choice preferences of the supporters of third-place candidate, Conservative R.O. Allison, were counted. Cook won by 52 votes over Bossenberry.  This is the only instance in this election where a candidate who lead in the first count was not elected in a second round count under the preferential balloting system.

Cook ran for a third term in the 1930 Alberta general election. He faced Bossenberry for the third time, this time in a straight fight. Bossenberry edged Cook out by 39 votes to defeat him.

Cook tried to regain his seat running in the 1935 Alberta general election. There were four candidates in the race this time. He faced Bossenberry for the fourth straight time who was defeated finishing second. Cook finished a very distant fourth place while Social Credit candidate Roy Taylor won the seat.

References

External links
Legislative Assembly of Alberta Members Listing

1966 deaths
United Farmers of Alberta MLAs
1881 births
Place of death missing